The International Cricket Council announced the officials for the 2007 ICC World Twenty20 on 26 July 2007.

Umpires

Five umpires from the Elite Panel of ICC Umpires, along with four members of the ICC International umpire panel complete the list of umpires for the twenty seven match tournament. A rotation system will see all officials serve on-field, as well as in third umpire capacities.

^ - includes international and domestic Twenty20 matches.

Three South African officials in Brian Jerling, Karl Hurter and Marais Erasmus will serve as fourth umpires for all matches in the group stage.

Referees

The three referees selected are all members of the Panel of ICC Referees, and they will be responsible for all twenty seven matches.

Suspended officials

Five of the ICC's top officials were suspended from duty for the 2007 Twenty20 World Championship by way of punishment for the chaotic end to the final of the 2007 Cricket World Cup, where they incorrectly interpreted the playing conditions. The suspended officials are umpires Steve Bucknor, Aleem Dar, Rudi Koertzen and Billy Bowden, along with referee Jeff Crowe, all of whom are members of the ICC's elite panels.

The suspension of these officials means that at least one of the umpires in the final will be taking charge of their first major ICC final, with Simon Taufel the only umpire chosen who has previously stood in a final (that being the final of the 2004 ICC Champions Trophy).

Style of umpiring

The fast-paced, exciting nature of Twenty20 cricket has led to some umpires in domestic Twenty20 competitions using much more flamboyant signals than they would otherwise use. The ICC has, however, issued special instructions to the umpires, telling them to remain calm and to officiate in their normal manner, so as not to distract spectators from the cricket and to ensure that they are concentrating fully on any decisions they may be asked to make.

Match appointments

Group stage

Super 8's

Semi-finals

Final

References

Officials Announced
Style of Umpiring
Suspended Officials
ICC Umpire and Referee Appointments

Cricket umpiring
Officials, 2007 Icc World Twenty20